Sphinx formosana is a moth of the family Sphingidae. It is known from the northern central mountains of Taiwan.

References

Sphinx (genus)
Moths described in 1970